Efraín Goldenberg Schreiber, or Efraím (born 28 December 1929), is a Peruvian politician who served as Finance and Economy Minister, Foreign Relations Minister, and Prime Minister during the presidency of then-President Alberto Fujimori.

Early life
Goldenberg was born on December 28, 1929, in Lima, Peru, to Romanian-Jewish immigrants. He grew up in Talara, and attended the Universidad Nacional Mayor de San Marcos.

Political career
On February 17, 1994, he was sworn in as Prime Minister of Peru by then President Alberto Fujimori, a position that he held until 1995. He was Peru's foreign relations minister prior to this office (August 28, 1993 – July 28, 1995). On October 15, 1999, he became Peru's Minister of Economy and Finance. He has had a role in the business community as chairperson of the National Fisheries Society and director of the Fund for the Promoting of Exports.

References

1929 births
Living people
Jewish Peruvian politicians
People from Lima
Peruvian Jews
Jewish prime ministers
20th-century Peruvian businesspeople
Peruvian people of Romanian-Jewish descent
Prime Ministers of Peru
Peruvian Ministers of Economy and Finance
Foreign ministers of Peru
National University of San Marcos alumni
Fujimorista politicians